Georgette Liying Chendana Chen (Born Chang Li Ying; 23 October 1906 – 15 March 1993), most commonly known as Georgette Chen, was a Singaporean painter and one of the pioneers of modern Singaporean art as well as the Nanyang style of art in the region.

A key figure in the development of modern art in Singapore, Chen is known for her oil paintings and contributions to art education as a teacher at the Nanyang Academy of Fine Arts (NAFA) from 1954 to 1981. Prior to being based in Malaya and Singapore from the 1950s onwards, Chen often travelled between cities such as Shanghai, Paris, New York and Tokyo. In 1982, Chen was awarded the Cultural Medallion for her contributions to the visual arts in Singapore.

On 15 March 1993, Chen died of complications from rheumatoid arthritis after an 11-year struggle with the ailment.

Early life and education
In 1906, Chen was born the fourth of 12 children—10 girls and 2 boys—in Zhejiang, China. Her father Zhang Renjie (Chang Sen Chek), was an antique dealer with businesses in Paris, London, and New York City. Due to her father's profession, Chen spent her childhood travelling between Paris and China with her family and attending high school in the US. Though living in the West, the Chang couple was deeply rooted to their Chinese heritage. Chen's father was a supporter of Sun Yat-sen, and provided financial support to Sun's anti-Qing revolutionary cause. Chen's mother only allowed her children to speak in Mandarin at home, while her father often brought the family along on his regular trips to China to support Sun's revolution, and to ensure that his children would not forget their own cultural identity.

Impressionist French period (1920s–1930s) 
Born into a privileged life, Chen was exposed to art at a young age. For most of her time in Paris she would either be painting at home, visiting museums, or roaming around the city every day. Chen attended high school in the US, and studied art at the Art Students League of New York for a year in 1926. She felt that Parisian life suited her better, and in 1927 she returned home to study at the Académie Colarossi and Académie Biloul in Paris. Though her parents provided financial support for her art education, they never fully accepted her decision to become a full-time artist, believing that artists would struggle to succeed financially in their careers.:]

Career

Post-Impressionist and Fauvist China–Hong Kong Period  (1930s–40s) 

In 1930, two of Chen's works were selected for inclusion in the Salon d'Automne exhibition in Paris. The same year, at 24-years old, she married Eugene Chen Youren, relocating from Paris to Shanghai as his wife in 1931. Eugene was a Chinese diplomat who had served as the foreign minister of Sun Yat-sen's Kuomintang (southern government) in the 1920s. He was a lover of music and the arts, supportive of Chen's work towards becoming a professional artist. She would be Eugene's second wife after the death of his first wife, Agatha Alphosin Ganteaume. In 1937 when the Sino-Japanese War broke out, the couple moved to Hong Kong, where Eugene was involved in anti-Japanese activities. In 1944, the couple would be arrested by the Japanese in a Hong Kong hotel. Shortly after in May 1944, Eugene succumbed to illness and died in Shanghai towards the end of World War II, widowing a 38-year old Chen.

In 1947, after several years of travelling across Asia while living in Shanghai, she married Ho Yung Chi, a close friend and former aide of Eugene. She then moved to New York City, where Ho worked as a journalist. In 1949, the artist held a major solo exhibition at the Asia Institute in New York, presenting paintings of China's landscapes and portraits that she created after the war. That same year, the couple moved to Paris, where Chen participated in the Salon d'Automne in Paris for the last time.

Nanyang style in Malaya and Singapore (1950s onwards) 

In 1951, with Chen longing to return to Asia, the couple relocated to Penang, Malaya. Chen would work there as an art teacher at Han Chiang High School, making many trips to Singapore during this period to visit several of her artist friends based there. In 1953, Chen mounted a solo exhibition at the Chinese Chamber of Commerce in Singapore. During her time in Singapore for the exhibition, she would meet the Nanyang Academy of Fine Arts (NAFA) president Lim Hak Tai, who invited Chen to teach at the academy, though she would not take up the offer then. Chen would divorce Ho in 1953, after which she would move to Singapore and spend the most artistically significant years of her life there. 

From 1954 to 1980, Chen would contribute significantly to visual art education in Singapore, working as a part-time art teacher at NAFA. During this period, she devoted her time to teaching and painting. When Singapore gained independence in 1965, Chen became a Singaporean. Chen was fond of Singapore as her new home, learning to speak the Malay language and adopting "Chendana" as a Malay name for herself. Her Malay artist friends had sought to find her a Malay name with the syllable "Chen" in it, and out of the many names suggested, she chose "Chendana", meaning sandalwood. In Chen's paintings from this period, she would paint tropical fruit like rambutan, landscapes depicting the Singapore River, also portraying Sikh guards and Buddhist monks, as she was drawn to the colours of their turbans and robes. Chen was awarded the Singapore Cultural Medallion in 1982 for her contributions to visual art in Singapore. 1982 marked the beginning of a long illness for Chen, while solo exhibitions of her work continued to be staged. In 1985, a solo exhibition was held at the National Museum Art Gallery in Singapore featuring 172 of her works, and another solo exhibition would be staged at the National Art Gallery in Kuala Lumpur, Malaysia a year later in 1986, which was attended by Tunku Abdul Rahman, the first prime minister of Malaysia.

Throughout the decades, Chen's subjects had regularly been drawn from her various countries of residence—emigrating to Southeast Asia allowed her to continue her practice of depicting local subjects through her Western art style. By interweaving Asian themes with her Western art training, Chen would come to be historicised as one of the pioneers of the Nanyang style together with Liu Kang, Chen Chong Swee, Chen Wen Hsi and Cheong Soo Pieng, a rare woman artist in a then male-dominated art community.

Death and legacy 
Chen died of complications from rheumatoid arthritis on March 15, 1993, at Mount Alvernia Hospital after an 11-year struggle with the ailment.

Lee Seng Gee, Chairman of the Lee Foundation was appointed as the executor of the Georgette Chen Estate. In April 1994, Chen's house on Siglap Plain was auctioned for S$2.8 million. The money raised from the auction was given to the Georgette Chen Arts Scholarship for art students managed by the National Arts Council. A collection of Chen's paintings were stowed away in two rooms of her home, and subsequently discovered by Lee. In June 1994, Lee donated the 53 newly discovered paintings to the Singapore Art Museum (SAM). This brought a total of 104 paintings by Chen to be found in the museum collection. Apart from donations from the sale proceeds of her house, sales from Chen's personal investments of stocks and shares were also used to fund a new building for the Singapore Council of Women's Organisations (SCWO), as well as for community welfare projects for the local Malay community, and to the Practice Theatre Ensemble (founded by Kuo Pao Kun) to support Chinese theatrical art in Singapore.

Chen is historicised as a significant figure in the development of modern art in Singapore, widely recognised for her achievements as an artist and contributions as an educator. Posthumous retrospectives of her work continue to be staged, such as the 1997 Georgette Chen, a paintings and drawings exhibition at the Singapore Art Museum. More recently from 27 November 2020 to 26 September 2021, Georgette Chen: At Home in the World was held at the National Gallery Singapore.

On 1 November 2021, Google honoured Chen with a doodle on its homepage.

In popular culture
In 2007, playwright Ng Yi-Sheng's musical Georgette was staged by Musical Theatre Ltd. In 2014, National Gallery Singapore published Eisner-nominated comic artist Sonny Liew's graphic novel, Warm Nights Deathless Days: The Life of Georgette Chen. Commissioned by the National Gallery Singapore, Channel NewsAsia produced a three-part docudrama, The Worlds of Georgette Chen, starring actress Rui En as Chen. The English-language series that was also adapted into Chinese, aired on Channel NewsAsia, MediaCorp Channel 5 and MediaCorp Channel 8 in April 2015.

On 1 November 2021, Chen would be celebrated in a Singapore and Malaysia-specific Google Doodle coinciding with the 91st anniversary of her first exhibition at the Salon d’Automne in Paris.

Solo exhibitions 

 Pioneer Artists of Singapore - Georgette Chen Retrospective 1985 – held at National Museum Art Gallery from 10 to 24 November 1985.
Georgette Chen, a retrospective exhibition at the Singapore Art Museum in 4 April–15 June 1997.
 Georgette Chen: At Home in the World – held at National Gallery Singapore from 27 November 2020 to 26 September 2021.

Publications 
 National Museum Art Gallery (1985), Pioneer Artists of Singapore: Georgette Chen Retrospective 1985, Singapore

See also
Singaporean art
Nanyang Style
Chen Chong Swee
Chen Wen Hsi
Cheong Soo Pieng
Liu Kang
Lim Hak Tai

References

External links 

National Library, Singapore Resource Guide on Georgette Chen
National Library Board Infopedia article on Georgette Chen
"Georgette Chen" in Channels and Confluences: A History of Singapore Art (1996) by Kwok Kian Chow

1906 births
1993 deaths
20th-century Singaporean painters
Académie Colarossi alumni
Art Students League of New York alumni
Recipients of the Cultural Medallion for art
Singaporean artists
Singaporean people of Chinese descent
Singaporean women artists
Singaporean women painters
Chinese expatriates in the United States
Chinese expatriates in France
Chinese emigrants to Malaysia